(or simply Kurokawa noh) is a noh festival in Kushibiki in Tsuruoka, Yamagata Prefecture, Japan.  It became an official Intangible Cultural Asset in 1976.

Kurokawa No Festival
Culture in Yamagata Prefecture